Rashtriya Vidyalaya Sangathan (R.V.S.), is a school channel located in New Delhi. It was established by the government of India under the Law of S.R.Act, 1860. R.V.S. currently runs schools by the name Rashtriya Vidyalaya in affiliation with the Central Board of Secondary Education (C.B.S.E.), New Delhi. Its operations are primarily focused on the rural, undeveloped parts of India.

References

Schools in Delhi